MD Rahmatullah (born 10 December 1984) is an Indian cricketer. He made his List A debut for Bihar in the 2018–19 Vijay Hazare Trophy on 19 September 2018. He made his first-class debut for Bihar in the 2018–19 Ranji Trophy on 1 November 2018. He was the leading run-scorer for Bihar in the tournament, with 375 runs in eight matches. He made his Twenty20 debut for Bihar in the 2018–19 Syed Mushtaq Ali Trophy on 22 February 2019.

References

External links
 

1984 births
Living people
Indian cricketers
Bihar cricketers
Place of birth missing (living people)